This is list of bays in Estonia. The list is incomplete.

References 

Bays
 
Estonia